Patrick Bogyako-Siaime is a Ghanaian politician and member of the Seventh Parliament of the Fourth Republic of Ghana representing the Amenfi East Constituency in the Western Region on the ticket of the New Patriotic Party.

References

Ghanaian MPs 2017–2021
1964 births
Living people
New Patriotic Party politicians